Lucas Márquez (born 21 July 1990) is an Argentine footballer who plays as a defender. He is currently a free agent.

Career
Márquez's youth career started with Deportivo San Agustín, which preceded a spell with 9 de Julio. He joined Sarmiento in 2007 and made his first-team debut two years later in Primera B Metropolitana. He departed Sarmiento three years after his debut, joining Agropecuario for the 2012–13 Torneo Argentino B season. One goal in twelve appearances followed. In 2013, Márquez joined fellow Torneo Argentino B side Once Tigres. He remained for one season, 2013–14, scoring three goals in thirty-eight games.

Career statistics
.

Honours
Sarmiento
Primera B Metropolitana: 2011–12

References

External links

1990 births
Living people
People from Junín, Buenos Aires
Argentine footballers
Association football defenders
Primera B Metropolitana players
Torneo Argentino B players
Club Atlético Sarmiento footballers
Club Agropecuario Argentino players
Sportspeople from Buenos Aires Province